"Magnificent" is the first official single from Rick Ross's third album Deeper Than Rap. It features John Legend and is produced by J.U.S.T.I.C.E. League. It is a R&B and hip hop song that samples "Gotta Make It Up To You" by Angela Bofill and also contains an interpolation of "I'm The Magnificent" by Special Ed.

Remix
The official remix was made which features John Legend, Big Boi, Special Ed & Diddy.

Music video
The music video has cameo appearances from DJ Khaled, Birdman, Ace Hood, Triple C's and Special Ed. It was released on March 3, 2009 and it was directed by music video director Gil Green. It was filmed at Gulfstream Park Racetrack in Hallandale Beach, Florida.

Charts

Weekly charts

Year-end charts

References 

2009 singles
2009 songs
Rick Ross songs
John Legend songs
Maybach Music Group singles
Songs written by John Legend
Songs written by Rick Ross
Music videos directed by Gil Green
Song recordings produced by J.U.S.T.I.C.E. League
Songs written by Narada Michael Walden
Songs written by Jeff Cohen (songwriter)
Songs written by Erik Ortiz